Daniel DeSanto is a Canadian actor.

Early life
Raised in the Toronto suburb of Etobicoke, DeSanto made his acting debut at the age of 8 as the lead protagonist in Brown Bread Sandwiches (a.k.a. La famiglia Buonanotte), a film about Italian immigrants in Toronto written and directed by Carlo Liconti. Prior to his first screen role, DeSanto had been in a juice commercial with Canadian figure skating star Elizabeth Manley, and was an avid hockey player. He later attended Martingrove Collegiate Institute and graduated in 1999. After attending MCI, he then attended Ryerson University for Film Studies.

Career
DeSanto is best known for playing Tucker on Are You Afraid of the Dark?, his 2004 role as Jason in Mean Girls, The Assassin in The Boondock Saints II: All Saints Day, Matt in The Adventures of Dudley the Dragon, the TV show The Magic School Bus in which he voices Carlos Ramon, and for voicing Ray on the Beyblade series and voicing Blaine on Totally Spies. Daniel also provided the voice of Dave in Total Drama Pahkitew Island.

Filmography

References

External links

Living people
Canadian male child actors
Canadian male film actors
Canadian male television actors
Canadian male voice actors
Canadian people of Italian descent
Male actors from Toronto
People from Etobicoke
Toronto Metropolitan University alumni
Year of birth missing (living people)
20th-century Canadian male actors
21st-century Canadian male actors